Paralicornia sinuosa is a species of colonial bryozoan in the Paralicornia genus, found in the Indo-Pacific region. It was originally classified as a member of the Scrupocellaria genus.

References 

Cheilostomatida